Hyposmocoma bitincta is a species of moth of the family Cosmopterigidae. It was first described by Lord Walsingham in 1907. It is endemic to the Hawaiian island of Maui and is possibly also present on Kauai and Oahu.

Larvae have been found in dead bark of Acacia koa.

External links

bitincta
Endemic moths of Hawaii
Moths described in 1907
Taxa named by Thomas de Grey, 6th Baron Walsingham